Perner is a surname. Notable people with the surname include:

Antonín Perner (1899–1973), Czechoslovak footballer
Carlos Perner (born 1947), Argentine alpine skier
Jan Perner (1815–1845), Czech engineer
Jaroslav Perner (1869–1947), Czech paleontologist
Wolfgang Perner (born 1967), Austrian biathlete